The Incredible Hulk is a syndicated newspaper strip, which debuted on October 30, 1978 and ran until September 5, 1982 by King Features Syndicate.

The strip
Initially written by Stan Lee and drawn by Larry Lieber, this strip modeled its version of the character after the television series airing at the time, with Banner's first name being given as "David", the McGee character, and a "wandering man" format. Although the depiction of the Hulk matched the comic books in terms of visual design, he did not speak dialog which is akin to the television version of the character. Lieber took over both writing and artwork soon after the strip launched. He later turned over art chores to first Rich Buckler (starting in Spring 1979) and then Alan Kupperberg (starting in November 1979), who also wrote the strip in its final months. The newspaper credits were slow to reflect changes in the creative team; Stan Lee, for instance, continued to appear in the byline for months after he gave up working on the strip.

Chapter guide

See also
 The Amazing Spider-Man (comic strip)

References

External links

Hulk (comics) titles
American comic strips
1978 comics debuts
1982 comics endings
Comic strips based on Marvel Comics publications
Comic strips started in the 1970s
Superhero comic strips